James Fletcher Epes (May 23, 1842 – August 24, 1910) was a U.S. Representative from Virginia, cousin of Sidney Parham Epes.

Biography
Born near Blackstone, Virginia, Epes attended private schools and the University of Virginia at Charlottesville.
During the Civil War he served in the Confederate States Army in Company E, Third Virginia Cavalry.
He was graduated from the law department of Washington and Lee University, Lexington, Virginia, in 1867.
He was admitted to the bar the same year and commenced practice at Nottoway Court House, Virginia.
He also engaged in agricultural pursuits.
He served as prosecuting attorney for Nottoway County during the years 1870–1883.

Epes was elected as a Democrat to the Fifty-second and Fifty-third Congresses (March 4, 1891 – March 3, 1895).
He was not a candidate for renomination in 1894.
He retired to his plantation, "The Old Place," near Blackstone, and engaged in agricultural pursuits until his death there August 24, 1910.
He was interred in Lake View Cemetery, Blackstone, Virginia.

Elections

1890; Epes was elected to the U.S. House of Representatives with 57.15% of the vote, defeating Republican John Mercer Langston.
1892; Epes was re-elected with 52.19% of the vote, defeating Populist J. Thomas Goode.

References

Sources

1842 births
1910 deaths
Virginia lawyers
People from Blackstone, Virginia
University of Virginia alumni
Democratic Party members of the United States House of Representatives from Virginia
Washington and Lee University alumni
People of Virginia in the American Civil War
Confederate States Army personnel
19th-century American politicians